Liu Jingsheng (born c.1950) is a Chinese political opposition activist and a former co-editor of Tansuo (Explorations), a journal he founded in the late 1970s with Wei Jingsheng.

Biography
Liu played a leading role in the Democracy Wall and was arrested (when?).  Upon his release, Liu resumed his job as a bus driver. In 1992, he was arrested again for his associations with "counter-revolutionary organizations."  Liu was released in November 2004.

Liu was awarded the PEN/Barbara Goldsmith Freedom to Write Award in 1998.

External links
 https://web.archive.org/web/20041216190445/http://pen.org/freedom/hm/liu.htm
 https://web.archive.org/web/20041209024600/http://usinfo.state.gov/dhr/Archive/2004/Dec/01-313610.html
 https://web.archive.org/web/20041220221125/http://laborrightsnow.org/Liu_case.htm

Chinese activists
People's Republic of China journalists
1950 births
Living people